Robert Rienaecker (d. 1916) was a British civil servant. He was employed in Hong Kong by the Colonial Treasury and Revenue Office as a book keeper between 1846 and 1850. He was a Freemason and was the Secretary of the Zetland Lodge in 1850. He was a member of the Committee of the Victoria Library and Reading Room in 1850. He was appointed Colonial Treasurer of Hong Kong in 1854.

References

1916 deaths
Financial Secretaries of Hong Kong
Government officials of Hong Kong